Ciarán Barry (born 1999) is an Irish hurler who plays for Limerick Senior Championship club Ahane and at inter-county level with the Limerick senior hurling team. He usually lines out as a defender.

Career

Barry first came to hurling prominence at juvenile and underage levels with the Ahane club before eventually progressing onto the club's senior team. He simultaneously lined out with the University of Limerick and University College Cork in the Fitzgibbon Cup. Barry first appeared on the inter-county scene during a two-year stint with the Limerick minor hurling team before later lining out with the under-21 team. He joined the Limerick senior hurling team during the 2022 National Hurling League.

Career statistics

Honours

Limerick
Munster Hurling Cup: 2022

References

1999 births
Living people
Ahane hurlers
Limerick inter-county hurlers